The athletics at the 2016 Summer Paralympics – men's 400 metres T13 event at the 2016 Paralympic Games took place on 13–15 September 2016, at the Estádio Olímpico João Havelange.

Heats

Heat 1 
17:30 13 September 2016:

Heat 2 
17:38 13 September 2016:

Final 
12:12 15 September 2016:

Notes

Athletics at the 2016 Summer Paralympics
2016 in men's athletics